Transparency is a North American music label mainly active in experimental, minimalist music, in classical and avant-garde music.

History

Transparency is an independent North American record label founded by Michael Sheppard, promoter of experimental and avant-garde music, who died in Los Angeles on March 17, 2016 at the age of 59.

Among his artists are Sun Ra, Sun Ra Arkestra, Helios Creed & Chrome, Alessandra Celletti, Hans Joachim Roedelius, Lawrence Ball, Lane Steinberg, Rufus Harley.

Sheppard published with his label Transparency the first punk groups in Los Angeles including The Germs and 45 Grave and he brought Throbbing Gristle to Los Angeles in 1981.

Transparency and Sun Ra 
In September 2011 Transparency published  Sun Ra-The Eternal Myth Revealed Vol. 1: 1914-1959 a box with 14 CDs containing 45 years of Sun Ra music. The realization of this document was launched by Michael D. Anderson, executive director of Sun Ra Music Archive in a press release in which Anderson himself said that "has produced this historically extensive work to bring to the attention of Sun Ra enthusiasts various facts and other music-related information they are not aware of …"" The presentation includes interview footage with Sun Ra and Anderson narrating each section of the presentation for detailed accuracy."

LP (album) 
 Galactic Octopi - Helios Creed (2 LP)

Compact disc 
 Passion & Faith - Lane Steinberg
 Artificial Artist - Ace Farren Ford
 Bagpipes Of The World- Rufus Harley
 Folding Pineapple - Steve Thomsen  
 Retrospective - Steve Thomsen 
 Live At Club Lingerie - Sun Ra Arkestra 
 Live At Myron's Ballroom - Sun Ra Arkestra  
 The Creator Of The Universe- Sun Ra
 The Shadows Took Shape - Sun Ra
 The Eternal Myth Revealed Vol.1 - Sun Ra
 Dance Of The Living Image - Sun Ra
 Intergalactic Research - Sun Ra*  
 Live At The Horseshoe Tavern, Toronto 1978 - Sun Ra*   
 The Complete Detroit Jazz Center Residency - Sun Ra And The Omniverse Jet Set Arkestra*  
 The Universe Sent Me - Sun Ra*  
 Helsinki 1971 - The Complete Concert And Interview - Sun Ra And His Intergalactic Solar Research Arkestra* –  
 Newport Jazz Festival-The Electric Circus - Sun Ra*   
 Live In Rome - Sun Ra
 Live In London - Sun Ra And The Intergalactic Research Arkestra
 Alessandra Celletti plays Baldassarre Galuppi - Alessandra Celletti
 Sustanza di Cose Sperata - Alessandra Celletti/Hans Joachim Roedelius -  
 Crazy Girl Blue
 Above the sky

Dvd
 The Super-8 Years With Tuxedomoon - Tuxedomoon 
 Solo Piano / Montreux And Lugano - Sun Ra / Sun Ra Arkestra*

Books
 Paraphernalia (book and dvd)  - Alessandra Celletti
 Painting with sound: Roedelius - Stephen Llife

References 

Record labels based in California